Dzi Croquettes is a 2009 Brazilian documentary film directed by Tatiana Issa and Raphael Alvarez about the dance and theater group of the same name.

Overview
The Dzi Croquettes were a groundbreaking dance and theater group who used their talent and a mix of humor and derision to challenge the violent dictatorship that gripped Brazil in the 1970s. Creating a new stage language that would influence an entire generation, this theater group revolutionized the gay movement despite being banned and censored by the military regime. Through interviews and archival footage of the group's performances, directors Raphael Alvarez and Tatiana Issa reveal the origin of the group, their relentless perfectionism, and their unexpected stroke of luck when Liza Minnelli becomes a godmother of sorts to them. However, it also gives an honest account of the sadness of their final years when tension, egos, AIDS, and even murder ripped them apart. The film combines candid interviews with group members and current Brazilian and International artists, showing how this group never flinched from challenging conventional notions of acceptable "masculine" or "feminine" behavior.

Release
The film had its US premiere at the acclaimed MoMA (Museum of Modern Art in New York) followed by theatrical release in the United States at the IFC Village Cinemas in New York and Sunset 5 Cinemas Los Angeles, besides theatrical release in Europe and Brazil.

Reception
The film received outstanding reviews in major newspapers such as New York Times, Los Angeles Times, LA Weekly, Film Journal International, Time Out New York, Village Voice, among others.

Awards
2009 - Festival do Rio (Rio de Janeiro International Film Festival) - Best Documentary Jury Award 
2009 - Festival do Rio (Rio de Janeiro International Film Festival) - Best Documentary Audience Award 
2009 - São Paulo International Film Festival - Best Documentary Itamaraty Award (Foreign Ministry Award) 
2009 - São Paulo International Film Festival - Best Documentary Audience Award 
2009 - 17th Mix Brazil International Film Festival - Best Documentary Audience Award 
2009 - 5th Festcine Goiania - Best Editing
2010 - Festival IN-EDIT 2010 - (In-Edit Documentary Film Festival) - Best Documentary Award
2010 - LABRFF 2010 - (Los Angeles Brazilian Film Festival) - Best Documentary Award
2010 - San Francisco International LGBT Film Festival - Frameline Outstanding Documentary Jury Award
2010 - Dance, Camera, West Los Angeles - DCW 2010  Best Outstanding Documentary Jury Award 
2010 - Brazilian Film Festival of MIAMI Miami- Best Film By the Audience Award
2010 - Brazilian Film Festival of LONDON London, U.K - Best Documentary Jury Award 
2010 - Torino International GLBT Film Festival Torino, Italy - WINNER Best Documentary Audience Award 
2011 - SESC Best Films of the Year São Paulo, Brazil - WINNER Best Documentary of the Year 
2011 - Brazilian Academy Awards Grande Premio do Cinema Brasileiro - Brazil. WINNER Best Documentary 
2011 - Brazilian Academy Awards Grande Premio do Cinema Brasileiro - Brazil. WINNER Best Editing 
2011 - Brazilian Golden Globes ACIE Foreign Press Awards - Brazil. WINNER Best Film of the Year

See also
The Cockettes, a documentary film about the San Francisco-based gay performance ensemble that inspired the Dzi Croquettes.

References

External links
 
 
 Review by the Los Angeles Times 
 Review by The New York Times 
 Review at Variety Magazine
 Review at the Film Journal International by David Noh 
 Review at the Village Voice
 Review by Time Out New York
 Review by L.A Weekly
 Review by Cultural Weekly
 Review by Slant Magazine

2009 films
Brazilian documentary films
2000s English-language films
2000s French-language films
2000s Portuguese-language films
Films shot in Rio de Janeiro (city)
Documentary films about dance
2009 documentary films
Documentary films about LGBT topics
Brazilian LGBT-related films
LGBT dance
2009 LGBT-related films